The Washington State Cougars baseball team is the varsity intercollegiate baseball team of Washington State University, located in Pullman, Washington. The Cougars' home venue is Bailey–Brayton Field, first opened  for the 1980 season and located on the university's campus.

The program has been a baseball member of the Pac-12 Conference in NCAA Division I since the start of the 1960 season, following the dissolution of the Pacific Coast Conference. Through 2014, the Cougars have appeared in four College World Series and 16 NCAA Tournaments. In conference postseason play, WSU has won one Northwest Conference Tournament, one Pacific Coast Conference Northern Division Tournament, one Pacific-8 Conference North Division Tournament, and four Pacific-10 Conference Northern Division Tournaments. In regular season play, the program has won five Northwest Conference Championships, 12 Pacific Coast Conference Northern Division titles, four AAWU Championships, nine Pac-8 North Division titles, and 11 Pac-10 North Division titles. As of the start of the 2013 Major League Baseball season, 32 former Cougars have appeared in Major League Baseball.

History

Early years
The first season of organized baseball at the school was in 1892, shortly after the school's founding. In that season, the team had an 11–1 record; its first game was a 26–0 victory over Pullman Military College on March 12. After a three-year hiatus from 1893–1895, the team returned for one season in 1896. After another break in 1897, baseball at Washington State returned permanently in 1898.  Previously led by team captains, H.E. Lougheed was named its first head coach for the 1901 season. Through the end of the 1909 season, the program competed as an independent and compiled  a 110–59–1 record.

Washington State joined the Northwest Conference in 1910; prior to the 1912–1913 academic year, former head football coach John R. Bender returned to Pullman from Saint Louis University. He also served as the school's head baseball coach beginning with the 1913 season, in which the team won its first Northwest Conference title and finished at 7–1. The team won the conference title in 1914 and 1915, along with the conference tournament in 1915.

After the 1915 season, Bender left to coach football at Kansas State and was replaced by Fred Bohler, who led the team to Northwest Conference titles in 1916 and 1918. Following the 1918 season, the program joined the Pacific Coast Conference (PCC), which had been formed in December 1915.  In its first season in the PCC, the team finished fourth in 1919.

In 1919, the college adopted the Cougar as its athletic programs' official nickname.

Buck Bailey era
In the summer of 1926, thirty-year-old Buck Bailey came to Pullman as an assistant football coach and head baseball coach. Born and raised in central Texas, Bailey played baseball and football at Texas A&M and served in the U.S. Army during the First World War. In his first season as head coach in 1927, the Cougar nine finished first in the PCC North Division and won the PCC Tournament.  The team also won the North Division title in 1933, 1936, and 1938.

In 1932, Art McLarney debuted for the New York Giants on August 23 and became the program's first alumnus to play in the major leagues.

In February 1943, Bailey joined the U.S. Navy during World War II.  The Eugene Register-Guard article that announced Bailey's departure referred to him as an "athletic comedian," and other sources attest that Bailey had a colorful coaching style. For three seasons, 1943–1945, basketball coach Jack Friel coached the program.

Bailey returned prior to the start of 1946 season and resumed his coaching duties.  From 1947–1950, the program won four consecutive PCC North Division titles.  This run culminated in the program's first College World Series appearance in 1950, the first College World Series played at Rosenblatt Stadium in Omaha, Nebraska.  To qualify, the Cougars defeated Stanford to win the PCC Tournament.  At the World Series, WSC opened with three consecutive wins over Tufts, Alabama, and Rutgers, but lost 12–1 to defending champion Texas, who had lost their opener in the double-elimination tournament. The last two teams remaining and both with one loss, the Cougars and Longhorns met again three days later in the national championship game, which Texas won 3–0. Future major leaguers Ted Tappe and Gene Conley played on the 1950 team.

The program reached the College World Series again under Bailey in 1956. To qualify from District VIII, the team defeated USC in the PCC Tournament. At the CWS in Omaha, the Cougars were eliminated without a win after consecutive defeats to Bradley and New Hampshire, and tied for seventh place with NYU.

After the 1959 baseball season, the PCC dissolved on July 1 following a scandal involving illegal payments to football players at several of its schools. In reaction, five former PCC members, formed the Athletic Association of Western Universities (AAWU), which Washington State's baseball program joined when play began in the 1960 season. Later renamed the Pac-8, it became the Pac-10 in 1978 and the Pac-12 in 2011.

The program qualified for the NCAA Tournament in each of its first two seasons in the AAWU. In both 1960 and 1961, the Cougars were eliminated by USC in Los Angeles in the District VIII Regional.

Three years after his retirement, Bailey and his wife Frances were killed in an automobile collision in New Mexico in October 1964.

Bobo Brayton era
Following Buck Bailey's retirement at the end of the 1961 season, the school hired Bobo Brayton, a former Washington State player and head baseball coach at Yakima Valley Junior College for a decade. In Brayton's first three seasons, WSU failed to qualify for the postseason, but won the AAWU North Division in 1965 and qualified for the NCAA Tournament. In the second round of the District VIII Regional, the Cougars defeated Stanford and advanced to the College World Series in Omaha. WSU finished third, with wins over Texas and Connecticut, and two losses to Ohio State. The second loss to Ohio State was 1–0 in 15 innings, a complete game by Buckeye starter Steve Arlin, who recorded twenty strikeouts and gave up just three hits.

In 1966, WSU again qualified for the NCAA Tournament but was eliminated by USC in the District VIII Regional finals. Following the season, future major leaguer Danny Frisella was selected by the New York Mets in the 1966 Major League Baseball Draft.  Following the 1968 season, two future major leaguers, Rick Austin and Ron Cey, signed professional contracts.

After missing the playoffs for three consecutive seasons from 1967–1969, the Cougars won the Pac-8 North Division title and qualified for the Pac-8 Tournament in 1970.  This division title started a streak of 11 consecutive North Division titles (1970–1981) and 19 of the 22 from 1970–1991.  In that stretch, the program qualified for eight NCAA Tournaments (1975, 1976, 1977, 1978, 1984, 1987, 1988, 1990).  In 1976, the Cougars hosted and won the West Regional, defeating Pepperdine and Cal State Fullerton twice, in order to advance to the College World Series.  In its first game, the team defeated Oklahoma, but then was eliminated by consecutive losses to Arizona State and Maine.

Following the 1979 baseball season, renovations of Martin Stadium, Washington State's football venue, led to the construction of a new running track. It was to be located on the site of today's Bailey–Brayton Field, but excavation difficulties led to an exchange of sites. The Mooberry Track was built on the old Bailey Field, north of Martin Stadium, and a new baseball venue was built to the east, retaining the name Bailey Field.

In 1984, stadium lighting was installed at the venue, and the first nighttime college baseball game in the Pacific Northwest was played between Washington State and Washington on May 11, 1984. In 1989, the field hosted Washington State's first nationally televised games, played on April 30 and May 1 against California and shown on ESPN.

In the late 1980s and early 1990s, two Cougars were named first team All-Americans.  Both John Olerud, selected in 1988, and Aaron Sele, selected in 1990, had lengthy careers in Major League Baseball. In addition to being named an All-American in 1988, Olerud was named the National Player of the Year.

Brayton retired after the 1994 season, finishing his career at WSU with 1,162 wins in 33 seasons. His Cougar teams reached ten NCAA Tournaments and two College World Series.

Post-Brayton

Steve Farrington
Steve Farrington, the head coach at Lower Columbia College in Longview for over a decade, was hired to replace Brayton in late June 1994. Originally from Newport, Oregon, he was a three-sport athlete at Eastern Washington in Cheney in the early 1970s; four years each of football and baseball and a year of basketball. Farrington's first season, 1995, was the third season of NCAA sanctions that had been imposed on the program for rules violations. Their overall record of 28–30 in 1995 was the first losing record at WSU since 1957, and the Cougars did not receive an at-large bid to the NCAA Tournament. Pac-10 champion USC advanced to the College World Series and finished as runner-up.

From 1996–1998, Farrington's teams finished third in the Pac-10 North three times, missing the playoffs in each season. In both 1999 and 2000, after the Pac-10 abolished its divisions, Washington State finished last in the Pac-10, with conference records of 4–20 and 6–18, and his contract was not renewed following the 2000 season. He later coached baseball at Columbia Basin College in Pasco, while also teaching science at Richland High School.

Prior to the 2000 season in January, Bailey Field was renamed Bailey–Brayton Field, adding Bobo Brayton's name to the Cougars' home venue.

Tim Mooney
In August 2000, Albertson College (College of Idaho) head coach Tim Mooney was hired to replace Farrington. Raised in Weiser, Idaho, he played at neighboring Idaho in the late 1970s, the final years of the Vandal baseball program. Mooney had great success as a head coach at Albertson in Caldwell, including an NAIA national title in 1998.

Under Mooney, the Cougars had losing conference records in each of his four seasons and finished no higher than a tie for eighth in the Pac-10. The only year with a winning overall record was his last in 2004, at 29–26, and 9–15 in conference. These struggles, combined with cases of Mooney physically and verbally abusing players, led to his resignation following the 2004 season. He was later a fundraiser for athletics for his alma mater in Moscow.

Donnie Marbut era
Donnie Marbut, who had served as an assistant under Mooney for one season in 2004, was promoted to head coach in late May. In his first several seasons at the helm, the program continued to struggle, finishing no higher than a sixth-place tie in the Pac-10. Marbut was also officially reprimanded by the university in 2006, when a Seattle Times report revealed that he had falsified parts of his résumé when applying for a coaching position at Washington State.

In 2009 and 2010, however, the Cougars finished near the top of the Pac-10 and appeared in the NCAA Tournament in both seasons–their first postseason bids in 20 years. In the 2009 tournament, the team appeared in the Norman Regional as a #3 seed. After losing the opening game to Arkansas, the Cougars defeated Wichita State 3–2 in an elimination game. In the next game, however, they were eliminated by Oklahoma.  In the 2010 tournament, the team earned a #2 seed in the Fayetteville Regional. This time, the team made it to within one win of the Super Regional round, but lost to Arkansas 7–2 in the elimination game. These are the Cougars' last postseason appearances to date.

After eleven seasons, a 314–304 record, and two post-season appearances, athletic director Bill Moos announced Marbut would not be returning for the 2016 season.

Marty Lees
On June 3, 2015, Marty Lees, an assistant from Oklahoma State was named head coach. After 4 seasons and an 68–132–1 record, Lees was fired on May 21, 2019.

Brian Green
On June 3, 2019, Brian Green was hired as the head coach away from the same position at New Mexico State.

Conference affiliations
 Independent (1892, 1896, 1898–1909, 1917, 1924)
 Northwest Conference (1910–1916, 1918)
 Pacific Coast Conference (1919–1923, 1925–1959)
 Pac-12 Conference (1960–present)
 Known as the Athletic Association of Western Universities from 1960–1968
 Known as the Pacific-8 Conference from 1969–1978
 Known as the Pacific-10 Conference from 1979–2011

Venues

Old Bailey Field
Following the Cougars' runner-up finish at the College World Series in 1950, the program's home venue was renamed Bailey Field.  The Cougars played at the field through the end of the 1979 season; it was located on the current site of Mooberry Track, with home plate at its northwest corner.

Bailey–Brayton Field

Following the 1978 football season, the university expanded Martin Stadium and removed its running track; a new track & field venue was planned to the northeast, at the site of the present baseball stadium. Difficulties in excavation and soil compaction led to the switch of track and baseball sites in 1979, and a new baseball stadium was built; it maintained the name Bailey Field when it opened at the start of the 1980 season.

The field was renovated in 1981, 1984, and 1988.  It was renamed Bailey–Brayton Field in early 2000, for Chuck Brayton, the program's head coach from 1962 to 1994. The facility has a capacity of 3,500 spectators and features a FieldTurf surface, electronic scoreboard, and stadium lighting.

Head coaches
The Cougars' head coach is Brian Green, hired on June 3, 2019.

The program's longest-tenured and most successful head coach is Chuck Brayton, who was head coach for 33 seasons (1962–1994) and led the Cougars to 1,162 wins.

Yearly records
The following is a list of the program's yearly records since 1892, its first season of varsity competition.

Notable former players

The following is a list of notable former Cougars and the seasons in which they played for the program.

 Norm Angelini (1968–1969)
 Rick Austin (1967–1968)
 Todd Belitz (1995–1997)
 Eddie Bonine (2002)
 Ed Bouchee (1952)
 Chuck Brayton (1946–1948)
 Alex Burg (2008–2009)
 Ron Cey (1968)
 Cliff Chambers (1941–1942)
 Gene Conley (1950)
 Don Crow (1977–1979)
 Dave Edler (1976–1978)
 Jack Friel (1921–1923)
 Danny Frisella (1965–1966)
 Greg Garrett (1967)
 Vince Hanson (1945)
 Scott Hatteberg (1990–1991)
 Mark Hendrickson (1995)
 Mike Kinkade (1992–1995)

 Mike Kinnunen (1977–1979)
 Don Long (1982–1983)
 Tom McGraw (1987–1990)
 Joe McIntosh (1971–1973)
 Art McLarney (1930–1932)
 Tom Niedenfuer (1979–1980)
 Paul Noce (1979–1981)
 John Olerud (1987–1989)
 Robert Ramsay (1993–1996)
 Rob Ryan (1993–1996)
 Aaron Sele (1989–1991)
 Doug Sisk (1980)
 Mark Small (1988–1989)
 Jack Spring (1952)
 Wes Stock (1954)
 Ted Tappe (1950)
 Dave Wainhouse (1986–1988)
 Eric Wilkins (1975–1977)

2012 MLB Draft
Five Cougars were selected in the 2012 Major League Baseball Draft: 1B Taylor Ard by the Seattle Mariners (7th round), OF Derek Jones by the Colorado Rockies (8th round), 2B Tommy Richards by the Baltimore Orioles (24th round), OF Kyle Johnson by the Los Angeles Angels (25th round), and 3B Patrick Claussen (34th round).  All five players elected to sign professional contracts.

References

External links